Vazisubani is an appellation for wines produced in a 62-square-kilometer zone around Vazisubani village in eastern Georgia.

Vazisubani is a dry, still white wine made of two grape varieties: Rkatsiteli and Mtsvane.

See also 
Georgian wine
Sweetness of wine
List of Georgian wine appellations

References 

Georgian wine
Georgian products with protected designation of origin